This is the discography of French singer Sheila, including as part of Sheila and B. Devotion.

Albums

Studio albums

Live albums

Compilation albums

Box sets

Video albums

Singles and EPs
On the table below, until 1970, in France, Wallonia and Spain, the majority of Sheila's releases were EPs (represented in italics) of which many were also released as 7-inch promo jukebox singles. However, in some countries, where singles were more commonly released, the titles refer to the single release of the EP.

Notes

References

Discographies of French artists
Pop music discographies